Dunham is an unincorporated community in Washington County, in the U.S. state of Ohio.

History
A post office called Dunham was established in 1857, and remained in operation until 1902. The community shares its name with the township in which it is located.

References

Unincorporated communities in Washington County, Ohio
1857 establishments in Ohio
Populated places established in 1857
Unincorporated communities in Ohio